Dutch Hill is a mountain located in the Catskill Mountains of New York east of Davenport Center. Webb Hill is located northwest, and Mine Hill is located southwest of Dutch Hill.

References

Mountains of Delaware County, New York
Mountains of New York (state)